Nardelli is an Italian surname, which means a descendant of "Nardo", a pet form of the name Leonardo ("lion-like"). The name may refer to:

Elania Nardelli (born 1987), Italian sport shooter
Francesco Nardelli (born 1953), Italian naturalist
Maria Nardelli (born 1954), Italian athlete 
Michael Nardelli (born 1983), American actor
Robert Nardelli (born 1948), American businessman
Stefano Nardelli (born 1993), Italian cyclist
Steve Nardelli (born 1948), British musician

References

Surnames of South Tyrolean origin

Italian-language surnames